Adam A. Scaife FRMetS FInstP is a British physicist and head of long range prediction at the Met Office. He is also a professor at Exeter University. 
Scaife carries out research into long range weather forecasting and computer modelling of the climate and has published around 200 peer reviewed studies on atmospheric dynamics, computer modelling and climate as well as popular science  and academic books on meteorology.

Career
Scaife studied Natural Sciences (Physics) at Cambridge University (1988-1991), Environmental Science at Surrey University (1991-1992) and was awarded a PhD in Meteorology from Reading University (1999). He joined the Met Office in 1992 where he worked on climate dynamics and the development of improved computer models of the climate
.

Many of his studies show how predictable factors 
 
 
affect weather from months to decades ahead. Since 2003 he has led teams of scientists in the Met Office Hadley Centre for Climate Prediction and Research, working on climate modeling and long range weather prediction. He now leads research and production of monthly, seasonal and decadal predictions at the Met Office.  Scaife and his team have made recent advances in long range weather forecasting  
 and have uncovered a signal to noise paradox that makes current climate models better at predicting the real world than they are at predicting themselves.

Scaife was co-chair of the World Meteorological Organisation's Working Group on Seasonal to Interannual Prediction and served as a member of the scientific steering group of the World Climate Research Programme's core project on the stratosphere and its role in climate. He is a fellow of the Institute of Physics and the Royal Meteorological Society and co-leads the World Meteorological Organisation's grand challenge on Near Term Climate Prediction.  
Scaife is also member of the Royal Meteorological Society climate communications group
, regularly comments on extreme climate events 
,
and is often involved in communicating climate science to the public
.

Awards
Institute of Physics Edward Appleton Medal (2020)
Royal Meteorological Society's Buchan Prize (2019)
Copernicus Medal (2018)
American Geophysical Union ASCENT Award (2016)
Royal Meteorological Society's Adrian Gill Award (2014)
L.G. Groves Memorial prize (2013)
Lloyds Science of Risk Prize for Climate Science (2011)

References

British meteorologists
Met Office
Academics of the University of Exeter
1970 births
Living people
Alumni of the University of Surrey
English physicists
Alumni of Fitzwilliam College, Cambridge
Alumni of the University of Reading